= Françoise Gravillon =

Dutch theater manager

Françoise Gravillon (1710–1781), was a Dutch theatre manager of French origin.

She was the daughter of Pierre Gravillon, a Frenchman employed at the Dutch court, and Jeanne Rat; married the French musician Jean Baptiste Anselme in 1728, and became the mother of the ballerina Rose Anselme. She was engaged as an opera singer and stage actress in the French theatre in The Hague between 1750 and 1769. She was also a shareholder in the same theatre, succeeded her spouse as its manager and director and served as such between 1759 and 1767 with her daughter as co-manager. As a singer and actor, she had a mediocre career, but as a theater manager and director, she played a major role in the contemporary French theatre influence in contemporary Dutch culture. Many new French plays had their Dutch premiere in her theatre. She was a successful theatre manager who managed the theatre with profit, and stayed in her position for over a decade when most of her successors resigned after but a short term.
